The men's regu sepak takraw competition at the 1990 Asian Games in Beijing was held from 30 September to 3 October at the Fengtai Gymnasium.

Results

Preliminary round

Group A

Group B

Knockout round

Semifinals

Bronze medal match

Final

References

External links
 Olympic Council of Asia

Sepak takraw at the 1990 Asian Games